is a Japanese science fiction romance novel written by Yomoji Otono and published by Hayakawa Publishing on June 23, 2016. An anime film adaptation by Bakken Record opened in Japan on October 7, 2022.

A second novel titled , also written by Yomoji Otono, was published by Hayakawa Publishing on the same day. An anime film adaptation of To Me, The One Who Loved You by TMS Entertainment also opened on October 7, 2022.

The third installment of the novel series titled 僕が君の名前を呼ぶから (Boku ga Kimi no Namae o Yobukara, lit. "Because I'm Calling Your Name"), also written by Yomoji Otono was published by Hayakawa Publishing on August 10, 2022.

Cast

To Every You I've Loved Before

To Me, The One Who Loved You

Media

Novels
At Anime Expo 2022, Seven Seas Entertainment announced that they licensed both novels for English publication. Both novels will be released in English on June 6, 2023.

Anime films
An anime film adaptation of To Every You I've Loved Before and an anime film adaptation of To Me, The One Who Loved You were announced on September 16, 2021. The To Every You I've Loved Before film is produced by Bakken Record and directed by Jun Matsumoto, while the To Me, The One Who Loved You film is produced by TMS Entertainment and directed by Ken'ichi Kasai. Riko Sakaguchi is penning the script for both films, shimano is credited for character design concepts for both films, And Takashi Ohmama is composing the music for both films. The theme song for To Every You I've Loved Before is "Kumo o Kō" (Love the Clouds) performed by Keina Suda, while the theme song for To Me, The One Who Loved You is "Shion" (Aster) performed by Saucy Dog. Both films premiered on October 7, 2022.

Reception
The novels have a cumulative 240,000 copies in print.

References

External links
 
 

2016 Japanese novels
Anime films based on novels
Japanese novels adapted into films
Japanese romance novels
Japanese science fiction novels
Romance anime and manga
Science fiction anime and manga
Seven Seas Entertainment titles
Tatsunoko Production
TMS Entertainment